Sole Agency and Representation is an album by The Javelins, a 1960s band fronted by Ian Gillan, which never made recordings until it reunited in 1994 to record an album of rock and roll covers. It was released in September 1994 by RPM Records.

It was re-issued in 2000 by Purple Records as Raving with Ian Gillan & The Javelins.

Track listing
"Too Much Monkey Business" (Chuck Berry) – 3:01
"It'll Be Me" (Jack Clement) – 1:59
"You Really Got a Hold on Me" (Smokey Robinson) – 3:00
"It's Only Make Believe" (Conway Twitty, Jack Nance) – 2:15
"Can I Get a Witness" (Holland–Dozier–Holland) – 3:04
"Poison Ivy" (Jerry Leiber, Mick Stoller) – 2:10
"Rave On" (Sonny West, Tilgham, Norman Petty) – 1:54
"Blue Monday" (Fats Domino, Dave Bartholomew) – 2:26
"You Better Move On" (Arthur Alexander) – 2:43
"Somethin' Else" (Sharon Sheeley. Eddie Cochran) – 2:07
"Money" (Janie Bradford, Berry Gordy) – 2:52
"Love Potion No. 9" (Leiber, Stoller) – 2:09
"Let's Dance" (Lee) – 2:30
"Roll Over Beethoven" (Berry) – 2:47

Personnel
 Ian Gillan: Vocals, harmonica
 Gordon Fairminer: Lead guitar
 Tony Tacon: Rhythm guitar
 Tony Whitfield: Bass guitar
 Keith Roach: Drums

Production notes
 Recorded at Parr Studios, Liverpool, January 1994
 Produced by Steve Morris

External links
 Ian Gillan Official Website

Ian Gillan albums
1994 debut albums